One Too Many Hearts is the third EP by American indie pop duo The Bird and the Bee. It was released digitally on February 12, 2008 by Blue Note Records. Inara "Bird" George provided lead vocals for the four tracks, while Greg "Bee" Kurstin plays the guitar and also produces the EP.

Track listing

References

2008 EPs
Albums produced by Greg Kurstin
The Bird and the Bee albums
Blue Note Records EPs